Provincial Trunk Highway 31 (PTH 31) is a provincial highway in the Canadian province of Manitoba. It is a short highway that runs from PTH 3 to the U.S. border where it becomes North Dakota State Highway 1.  The entire highway lies within the Municipality of Pembina.

History
Highway 31 was the designation of the route connecting PTH 16 (then known as Highway 4) at Russell to PTH 5 in Roblin. In 1947, it extended north via Benito to Highway 10 at Swan River, replacing Highway 6. The section from Roblin to south of Benito was under construction; it opened in 1948. In 1954, the section of PTH 83 between the Trans-Canada Highway and Birtle was constructed and opened to traffic. With this addition, PTH 83 was also extended to Swan River, replacing Highway 31.

PTH 31 was designated to its current route in 1959.

Major intersections

References

031